Casanova is a 2005 British television comedy drama serial, written by television scriptwriter Russell T Davies and directed by Sheree Folkson. Produced by Red Production Company for BBC Wales in association with Granada Television, the 3-episode series was first screened on digital television station BBC Three from 13 March, with a repeat on mainstream analogue network BBC One commencing 4 April.

Synopsis

Telling the story of the life of 18th century Italian adventurer Giacomo Casanova, based on his own twelve-volume memoirs, the one-hour episodes star Peter O'Toole as the older Casanova looking back on his life and David Tennant as the younger version. Rose Byrne, Rupert Penry-Jones, Matt Lucas, Shaun Parkes, Nina Sosanya and Laura Fraser are also featured.

Cast

 David Tennant as Giacomo Casanova
 John Sandilands as 5-year-old Giacomo Casanova
 Zachary Fox as 11-year-old Giacomo Casanova
 Peter O'Toole as Old Giacomo Casanova
 Tom Burke as 20-year-old Giac Casanova
 James Holly as 6-year-old Giac Casanova
 Brock Everitt Elwick as 11-year-old Giac Casanova
 Laura Fraser as Henriette
 Rupert Penry-Jones as Grimani
 Nina Sosanya as Bellino
 Shaun Parkes as Rocco
 Rose Byrne as Edith
 Freddie Jones as Bragadin

Comedians Matt Lucas, Mark Heap, Simon Day and Matthew Holness make cameo appearances.

Episodes

Production

The series was originally commissioned from Davies by Executive Producer Julie Gardner when she was working at Granada-owned London Weekend Television. However, after Gardner moved on to become Head of Drama at BBC Wales in 2003, she commissioned Davies to write the drama for the BBC instead, as part of the deal that also saw him installed as the chief writer and Executive Producer of Doctor Who (in which Tennant later played the Doctor's tenth incarnation), also being overseen by Gardner and made at BBC Wales. It was Tennant's role as Giacomo that led to Davies casting him in Doctor Who as the Tenth Doctor.

It was aired in the United States in two parts, 8 and 15 October 2006, with the full unedited British version released on DVD the following week, 17 October 2006. The programme also aired in Australia on the ABC, again edited into two parts.

Home media
The serial was released on DVD in the UK in May 2005, and in the United States in October 2006.

References

External links
Casanova  at the Red Production Company website.
Casanova at the Masterpiece Theatre website.

2000s British drama television series
2005 British television series debuts
2005 British television series endings
BBC television dramas
2000s British television miniseries
BBC Cymru Wales television shows
Cultural depictions of Giacomo Casanova
Television shows written by Russell T Davies
Television series by ITV Studios
Television series by Red Production Company
Television shows produced by Granada Television
English-language television shows
Television series created by Russell T Davies
Nonlinear narrative television series